International Studio & Curatorial Program (ISCP) is a contemporary art institution that runs an international residency program and related exhibitions and events   based in Brooklyn, New York. ISCP's exhibitions, talks, screenings and lectures generally focus on introducing New York audiences to work produced by international artists. The residency program has hosted more than 1,800 artists and curators  from 90 countries, including the United States.

The International Studio Program (ISP) was founded in 1994 in TriBeCa, Lower Manhattan. The governments of Sweden, Denmark, France, Spain, Portugal, Finland, Poland, and the Asian Cultural Council joined the initiative shortly thereafter.  In 1999, the organization added curatorial residencies, and became the International Studio & Curatorial Program (ISCP) with the Trust for Mutual Understanding sponsoring a curator from Czech Republic. In 2001, ISCP relocated to Hell's Kitchen, Manhattan and in 2008, ISCP moved to East Williamsburg, Brooklyn and increased its capacity to 35 studios. ISCP's programs are currently housed in a former factory built in 1901, which was the world's first air-conditioned building.

Notable alumni

 Benandsebastian
 Pierre Bismuth
 Stefano Cagol
 Firoz Mahmud, Bangladesh
 Amy Cheung (Hong Kong artist)
 Zoe Crosher
 Mai Abu ElDahab
 Petra Feriancova
 Theaster Gates
 Frances Goodman
 Camille Henrot 
 Natasha Johns-Messenger
 Michael Jones McKean
 Jesper Just
 Gabriel Lester
 Aris Kalaizis
 Joachim Koester
 John Korner
 Kasper Kovitz
 Agnieszka Kurant
 Renzo Martens
 Bjørn Melhus
 Kate Newby
 Orlan
 Pak Sheung Chuen
 Max Pam
 Patricia Piccinini
 Edward Poitras
 Nicolas Provost
 Ernesto Ríos
 Valerio Rocco Orlando
 Julika Rudelius
 Børre Sæthre
 Marinella Senatore
 Eva Koťátková
 Necmi Sönmez
 Miha Štrukelj
 Guido van der Werve
 Rob Voerman
 Marjorie Welish
 Naomi Andrée Campbell
Hikaru Fujii
 Chi Wo Leung

References

Contemporary art galleries in the United States
Arts organizations based in New York City
Arts centers in New York City